Péter Molnár may refer to:

 Péter Molnár (academic), Hungarian academic and former politician
 Péter Molnár (footballer) (born 1983), football goalkeeper from Slovakia for BFC Siófok
 Peter Molnar (geophysicist) (1943–2022), professor in geological sciences
 Péter Molnár (canoeist) (born 1986), Olympic Hungarian canoeist